William Guglielmo Niederland (29 August 1904 – 30 July 1993) was a German-American psychoanalyst and a pioneer in the scholarly field of psychogeography. He was born in Schippenbeil, East Prussia, the son of an orthodox rabbi, and in early life was exposed to both the classic Talmudic education and to the secular learning of the Realgymnasium of Würzburg, Bavaria. After completing his medical studies at the University of Würzburg, he went on to an internship and residency in medicine. For years he served as an officer of the Department of Health for the industrial region of the Ruhr. In the 1950s, he began work with concentration camp survivors. He investigated and documented the particular characteristics of their reactions, coining the term "survivor syndrome" in 1961. He later worked with the Vietnam Veteran Working Group in restoring the concept of post-traumatic stress disorders to the American Psychiatric Association's Diagnostic and Statistical Manual of Mental Disorders (DSM-III) in 1980. Niederland is the author of The Schreber Case: Psychoanalytic Profile of a Paranoid Personality (1974), which is about Daniel Paul Schreber.

References 

2. "Psychiatric Status of Holocaust Survivors"
NIEDERLAND, Wm. G.  Am J Psychiatry. 1982; 139: 1646

External links
Guide to the Papers of William G. Niederland Collection (1904–1993) at the Leo Baeck Institute, New York.

American psychiatrists
German psychiatrists
1904 births
1993 deaths
People from Bartoszyce County
People from East Prussia
German healthcare managers
20th-century American physicians
German emigrants to the United States